Psadaria is a genus of wood midges in the family Cecidomyiidae. The one described species - Psadaria pallida - is only known from Alejandro Selkirk Island in Chile. The genus was established by Günther Enderlein in 1940.

References

Cecidomyiidae genera

Insects described in 1940
Taxa named by Günther Enderlein
Diptera of South America
Monotypic Diptera genera